Violet Showers Johnson is professor of history and director of Africana studies at Texas A&M University. She was born in Lagos, Nigeria to Sierra Leone Creole parents , and grew up in Nigeria and Sierra Leone.

Education
Johnson received her BA (honors in history) from Fourah Bay College, University of Sierra Leone; MA from the University of New Brunswick, Canada; and  Ph.D. from Boston College. She taught at Fourah Bay College before moving to the United States in 1985 on a Fulbright Scholarship. After twenty years at Agnes Scott College in Decatur, Georgia, she moved to Texas A&M University in July 2012. She is associate dean and professor of history in the College of Liberal Arts.

Research and publications 

A naturalized American, Johnson's international personal and academic background has shaped much of her work as a teacher and scholar. She focuses on race, ethnicity and immigration, African American history, African history, and the history of the African Diaspora. She has written extensively on the Black immigrant experience in America.  Her publications include The Other Black Bostonians: West Indians in Boston (Indiana University Press, 2006); What, then, is the African American? African and Afro-Caribbean Identities in Black America (Journal of American Ethnic History, 2008); with Marilyn Halter, African & American: West Africans in Post-Civil Rights America (NYU Press, 2014). She served as lead editor for a volume of essays entitled Deferred Dreams, Defiant Struggles: Critical Perspectives on Blackness, Belonging, and Civil Rights (Liverpool University Press, 2018).

Johnson is president of the Collegium for African American Research (CAAR), a professional academic organization based in Europe.

References

Sierra Leone Creole historians
Sierra Leonean academics
Sierra Leone Creole people
Historians of Africa
People from Freetown
Boston College alumni
Fourah Bay College alumni
Academic staff of Fourah Bay College
Historians of Sierra Leone
Sierra Leonean expatriates in the United States
Texas A&M University faculty
Year of birth missing (living people)
Living people